University of Iowa Stead Family Children's Hospital formerly University of Iowa Children's Hospital and Children's Hospital of Iowa is a pediatric acute care academic children's hospital located in Iowa City, Iowa. The hospital was founded in 1919 and its current facility, opened in 2017, overlooks the university's football home, Kinnick Stadium. The hospital has 190 inpatient pediatric beds and is affiliated with the University of Iowa Carver College of Medicine. The hospital provides comprehensive pediatric specialties and subspecialties to pediatric patients aged 0–21 throughout Iowa and is one of the only children's hospitals in the region and state. University of Iowa Stead Family Children's Hospital also features the only ACS verified Level 1 Pediatric Trauma Center in the state.

UI Children's Hospital also has an extensive library of health information for people of various ages.

History 
The hospital originally was founded in 1919.

Firsts
The University of Iowa Hospitals and Clinics is also where Dr. Ignacio Ponseti developed the Ponseti method. The Ponseti method is a revolutionary non-surgical way to treat congenital clubfoot, which had previously been treated through surgeries to infants or children at a young age. The Ponseti method is a way to treat clubfoot through a series of manipulating bones and tendons in the foot and holding them in place through a series of casts. It is a treatment technique that is still used worldwide to this day.

New facilities
In the fall of 2012, a project began to create a new University of Iowa Children's Hospital. The hospital is located to the west of the original at the site of a former parking structure for University Hospital, overlooking Kinnick Stadium, and is also connected to the hospital and new parking structure. The target completion date for the project was initially set for March 2016, but delays meant that the new facility did not receive its first patients until February 2017; seven of the 14 floors opened at that time while construction on other floors was nearing completion.

The project cost approximately $292 million – none of which was funded by tax dollars. The funding was achieved through bonds, patient revenue, and private gifts.

The building is 480,000 square feet of new construction as well as 56,250 square feet of renovated existing space. It contains 14 floors (12 above ground, two below ground). Those 14 floors include a total of 134 beds for patients, those being for Pediatric care, Neonatal, Medical/Surgical Units, Operating Rooms, Infusion/Dialysis Center and finally the Pediatric Cancer Center. The two lower-level floors are where Radiology and Procedure Suites are located. 

The new design of the hospital is strategically designed to reduce the wind and eliminate noise with the curves of the building. All of the glass used on the project is impact resistant for safety concerns of families. The amount of daylight is said to make patients feel welcome and creates a place of healing. 

A live webcam of the construction was maintained throughout the process, as well as an update of the latest construction phase for the building.

Divisions
The following medical divisions are available:
General Pediatrics, Family Medicine, Adolescent Medicine, Allergy/Pulmonary diseases, Anesthesia, Blood and Marrow Transplantation, Burn Treatment, Cardiology, Child Abuse and Neglect, Child Health Specialty Clinics, Child Neurology, Child Psychology, Child Psychiatry, Clinical Pharmacology, Continuity of Care, Critical Care, Dentistry, Dermatology, Developmental Disabilities, ECMO, Emergency Care, Endocrinology, Gastroenterology, Genetics, Hematology, Infectious Diseases, Mother's Milk Bank of Iowa, Neonatology, Nephrology, Neurosurgery, Nuclear Medicine, Nutrition, Obstetrics/Gynecology, Oncology, Ophthalmology, Oral and Maxillofacial Surgery, Orthodontics, Orthopaedic Surgery, Spinal Deformity, Otolaryngology-Head and Neck Surgery, Speech, Swallowing, Voice, Pediatric Outreach Clinics (Cardiac-Electrophysiology, Cardiology, Cystic Fibrosis, Diabetes/Endocrinology, Endocrinology, Gastroenterology, Hemoglobinopathy, Neurology, Neuromuscular), Radiation Oncology, Radiology, Rheumatology, Special Education, Specialized Child Health Services, Surgery (Pediatric), Thoracic and Cardiovascular Surgery, Toxicology, Transplantation Surgery, Trauma Surgery, and Urology.

University of Iowa Hospitals and Clinics is in partnership with University of Iowa Roy J. and Lucille A. Carver College of Medicine and University of Iowa Children's Hospital which completes the state University of Iowa Health Care.

Awards 

 Parent Magazine ranked UI Children's Hospital as the 20th ranked Children's Hospital in America for 2009.
 U.S. News & World Reports annual publication of "America's Best Children's Hospitals" ranked UI Children's pediatric kidney disorders treatment program as 25th.  This makes UI Children's Hospital the first in Iowa to achieve a pediatric ranking.
U.S. News & World Reports ranking of Best Children's Hospitals ranked University of Iowa Children's Hospital in seven specialties:
Cancer
Cardiology and heart surgery
Diabetes and endocrinology
Nephrology
Neurology and neurosurgery
Orthopedics
Pulmonology
First hospital in Iowa to receive Magnet designation for nursing excellence. Received designations in 2004, 2008, and 2013.
The first pediatrics hospital in Iowa designation as a Level 1 Trauma Center for pediatrics from the Committee on Trauma of the American College of Surgeons.
Selected by the Cystic Fibrosis Foundation as a Quality Care Award recipient (2009).
OptumHealth Care Solutions designated neonatal intensive care (2012) and bone marrow transplant (2008) services as "Centers of Excellence."
The pediatric heart transplant program received the Transplant Access Program designation from OptumHealth Care Solutions in 2008.

Community

Kid Captain program
Since 2008 the University of Iowa Children's Hospital has teamed up with the Iowa Hawkeyes to honor UI Children's Hospital patients and celebrate their inspirational stories.

Kid Captains are nominated by those familiar with them and are given the opportunity to be an honorary captain at a University of Iowa football game.

Fourteen children are chosen every year. In 2013 there were 462 children nominated.

The Wave
The opening of the new hospital led to the creation of what ESPN called "college football's coolest new tradition". The new facility includes a top-floor lounge area known as the Press Box Cafe that has a view of the entire Kinnick Stadium field, allowing patients and their families to see all Iowa home games live, and also includes big-screen TVs to allow them to watch Hawkeyes road games. A suggestion on a Hawkeyes fan page on Facebook led to "The Wave"—at the end of the first quarter of Iowa home games, the crowd faces the hospital and waves at the patients and their families watching in the Press Box. For the Hawkeyes' first night home game of the 2017 season against Penn State, the fan site where the idea of "The Wave" originated encouraged fans to turn on their cell phone flashlights while they waved to the patients.

See also 

 List of Children's Hospitals in the United States

References

External links
 University of Iowa Stead Family Children's Hospital
 University of Iowa Children's Hospital Facebook
 The University of Iowa
 University of Iowa Children's Twitter

Hospital buildings completed in 1919
Hospital buildings completed in 2017
Hospitals in Iowa
Children's hospitals in the United States
1919 establishments in Iowa
Pediatric trauma centers